Ronald William Simpson (22 April 1926 – 11 August 2016) was a former Australian rules footballer who played with Fitzroy in the Victorian Football League (VFL). 

In 1945 he enlisted in the Royal Australian Air Force.

Simpson won Tongala's best and fairest award in 1944.

Notes

External links 

				
1926 births
2016 deaths		
Royal Australian Air Force personnel of World War II
Australian rules footballers from Victoria (Australia)		
Fitzroy Football Club players
Cobram Football Club players